San Pedro Apóstol Church (St Peter the Apostle in English) is a parish church in La Línea de la Concepción, Andalusia, Spain.

References

Churches in the Province of Cádiz
La Línea de la Concepción
Buildings and structures in the Province of Cádiz
20th-century Roman Catholic church buildings in Spain